GNF may refer to:

Transport 
 Gandalf Airlines, a defunct Italian airline
 Gansner Field, an airport in California, United States
 Greenfield railway station, in Greater Manchester, England
 Grenada Municipal Airport, in Mississippi, United States

Other uses 
 Botola, or GNF 1, Moroccan football league division 1 
 Botola 2, or GNF 2, Moroccan football league division 2
 GeorgeNotFound, an English internet personality
 Give No Fxk, a song by Migos ft. Young Thug & Travis Scott
 GNF (OKOKOK), a song by Polo G
 Greibach normal form
 Guinean franc, the currency of Guinea